Fimbristylis corynocarya is a sedge of the family Cyperaceae that is native to Australia.

It blooms between April and May and produces green-brown flowers.

References

Plants described in 1859
Flora of Western Australia
corynocarya
Taxa named by Ferdinand von Mueller